The 2010 NCAA Bowling Championship was the seventh annual tournament to determine the national champion of women's NCAA collegiate ten-pin bowling. The tournament was played at Carolier Brunswick Zone in North Brunswick, New Jersey during April 2009.

Fairleigh Dickinson defeated Nebraska in the championship match, 4 games to 3 (209–167, 202–222, 203–213, 229–192, 201–222, 230–190, 208–174), to win their second national title. The Knights were coached by Mike LoPresti.

FDU's Daniele McEwan was named the tournament's Most Outstanding Player. McEwan, along with four other bowlers, also comprised the All Tournament Team.

Qualification
Since there is only one national collegiate championship for women's bowling, all NCAA bowling programs (whether from Division I, Division II, or Division III) were eligible. A total of 8 teams were invited to contest this championship, which consisted of a modified double-elimination style tournament.

Tournament bracket 
Site: Carolier Brunswick Zone, North Brunswick, New Jersey

All-tournament team
Daniele McEwan, Fairleigh Dickinson (Most Outstanding Player)
Cassandra Leuthold, Nebraska
Jenn Marmo, New Jersey City
Erica Perez, Fairleigh Dickinson
Samantha Santoro, Arkansas State

References

NCAA Bowling Championship
NCAA Bowling Championship
2010 in bowling
2010 in sports in New Jersey
April 2010 sports events in the United States